Miotine is an anticholinesterase drug. Miotine was the first synthetic carbamate that was used clinically.

Unlike the miotine analog neostigmine, it doesn't have a quaternary ammonium group to give it a permanent positive charge. It can exist as an uncharged free base which could allow it to cross the blood–brain barrier and cause unwanted central nervous system (CNS) side effects.

See also
Neostigmine
T-1123
TL-1238
TMTFA

References 

Acetylcholinesterase inhibitors
Aromatic carbamates
Phenol esters